Eupithecia resarta is a moth in the family Geometridae. It is found in Kenya, Tanzania and Uganda.

References

Moths described in 1932
resarta
Moths of Africa